Mount Colvin is the 39th highest peak in the High Peaks Region of the Adirondack Mountains in the U.S. State of New York. Mount Colvin offers excellent views of a number of other Adirondack High Peaks, most notably the peaks that comprise the Great Range. High Peaks that are readily visible from Colvin include Giant, Rocky Peak Ridge, Upper Wolfjaw, Lower Wolfjaw, Armstrong, Sawteeth, Gothics, Saddleback, Basin, Tabletop, Marcy, Haystack, Redfield, Allen, Nippletop, Dial and Blake.

The mountain is named after Verplanck Colvin, an explorer of the Adirondacks and the director of the survey which mapped the region.  Originally named Mount Sabele and unknown to Colvin, he deferred to a survey team member to name it.  The member chose Mount Colvin to honor his leader.

References
 Webb, Nina H. (1996), Footsteps Through the Adirondacks, The Verplanck Colvin Story, North Country Books, Utica NY.

External links
 
 Mount Colvin at Peakbagger
 Mount Colvin at Summitpost

Mountains of Essex County, New York
Adirondack High Peaks
Mountains of New York (state)